Lee Edward Unkrich (born August 8, 1967) is an American film director, film editor, screenwriter, and animator. He was a longtime member of the creative team at Pixar, where he started in 1994 as a film editor. He later began directing, first as co-director of Toy Story 2.

After co-directing Toy Story 2, Monsters, Inc. and Finding Nemo, Unkrich made his solo directorial debut with Toy Story 3 in 2010, and most recently directed Coco in 2017, both of which won the Academy Award for Best Animated Feature and the Academy Award for Best Original Song.

After working at Pixar for 25 years, Unkrich retired from the company in January 2019 to spend more time with his family and pursue other interests.

Early life and career
Unkrich was raised in Chagrin Falls, Ohio. His father, Bob Unkrich, was a World War II veteran ("He stormed the beach at Normandy") and artist. Unkrich was raised in the Jewish faith. He spent his youth acting at The Cleveland Play House. Unkrich graduated from the University of Southern California School of Cinematic Arts in 1990.

Unkrich was Vice-President of Editorial and Layout at Pixar. Before joining the studio, Unkrich worked for several years in television as an editor and director. In 1994 he was hired by Pixar as a short-term employee for a period of four weeks, but ended up staying for 25 years. He is the 2011 recipient of the University of Southern California's Mary Pickford Distinguished Alumni Award recognizing alumni contributions to the cinematic arts.

On January 18, 2019, Unkrich announced he was leaving Pixar to spend time with his family and pursue interests that have "long been back-burnered."

In late 2022 he announced he has completed editing a book about The Shining, written by J. W. Rinzler.

Personal life
Unkrich is married to Laura Century and they have three children: Hannah, Alice, and Max. Unkrich came out as bisexual to his family and friends in 2021 but only revealed it to the public in 2022.

Filmography

Features

Television
Prison Stories: Women on the Inside (1991) (TV) (production assistant)
Silk Stalkings (1991) (TV Series) (assistant editor, editor, director)
Renegade (1993) (TV series) (assistant editor)
Betrayed by Love (1994) (TV) (assistant editor)
Separated by Murder (1995) (TV) (editor)

Documentaries

Shorts and TV specials

References

External links

1967 births
20th-century American male actors 
21st-century American male actors
American animated film directors
American film editors
American male voice actors
Animators from Ohio
Animation screenwriters
Annie Award winners
Bisexual Jews
Contestants on American game shows
Directors of Best Animated Feature Academy Award winners
Film directors from Ohio
Jewish American writers
Jewish film people
Jews and Judaism in Ohio
LGBT animators
LGBT film directors
Living people
Male actors from Ohio
People from Chagrin Falls, Ohio
Pixar people
USC School of Cinematic Arts alumni